Eteoryctis syngramma is a moth of the family Gracillariidae. It is known from Hong Kong, India (Andaman Islands, Karnataka and the Nicobar Islands), Indonesia and Thailand.

The larvae feed on Anacardium occidentale and Mangifera indica. They mine the leaves of their host plant. The mine has the form of a rather large, round or elliptical blotch mine on the upperside of the leaf. It is greyish-white, including dark grains of frass.

References

Acrocercopinae
Moths of Asia
Moths described in 1914